Kazma is a city in Kuwait. 

Kazma may also refer to:

Kazma Sakamoto (born 1982), Japanese professional wrestler and manager
King Kaza, a fictional character in the Japanese animated science fiction film Summer Wars
Al Kazma Kuwait, Kuwaiti football (soccer) club based in Kazma, Kuwait

See also
Qazma, also Kazma or Kazmatabun, village in Azerbaijan